Pascal Jenny (born 6 July 1978) is a former Swiss football defender.

Career
He currently plays for SC Düdingen in the First Division. Jenny previously played in the Swiss Super League for Servette FC, FC Winterthur, Yverdon-Sport, FC St. Gallen and Neuchâtel Xamax.

References

1978 births
Living people
Swiss men's footballers
Neuchâtel Xamax FCS players
Servette FC players
Yverdon-Sport FC players
FC Winterthur players
FC St. Gallen players
FC Fribourg players
Association football defenders
Sportspeople from the canton of Fribourg